Carr Houses is a hamlet situated half a mile east of Ince Blundell, in Sefton, Merseyside, England. It is a traditional grouping of farm buildings built on medieval footings. Rigmaiden Farm and Cottage date back to the 17th century. Kiln Barn and Hare Barn have been renovated and converted into residential dwellings. Damson Cottage has also been renovated and was originally of cruck frame construction.

References

Towns and villages in the Metropolitan Borough of Sefton